Voice of the Voiceless may refer to

Voice of the Voiceless (album)
Voices of the Voiceless (Congo) 
The Voice of the Voiceless, 2013 Mexican silent film
Voice of the Voiceless (film), 2020 Indian film

See also
Voice for the Voiceless, 2019 Russian documentary film